Trachyopella is a genus of flies belonging to the family of the Lesser Dung flies.

Species
Subgenus Nudopella Roháček & Marshall, 1986
T. collinella (Richards, 1946)
T. hem Roháček & Marshall, 1986
T. leucoptera (Haliday, 1836)
T. operta Roháček & Marshall, 1986
Subgenus Trachyopella Duda, 1918
T. aposterna Marshall in Marshall & Montagnes, 1990
T. apotarsata Marshall in Marshall & Montagnes, 1990
T. artivena Roháček & Marshall, 1986
T. atomus (Rondani, 1880)
T. binuda Roháček & Marshall, 1986
T. bovilla Collin, 1954
T. brachystoma (Papp, 1972)
T. brevisectoris Marshall in Marshall & Montagnes, 1990
T. coprina (Duda, 1918)
T. folkei Roháček, 1990
T. formosae (Duda, 1925)
T. hardyi (Tenorio, 1967)
T. hyalinervis (Duda, 1925)
T. kuntzei (Duda, 1918)
T. lineafrons (Spuler, 1925)
T. luteocera Marshall in Marshall & Montagnes, 1990
T. melania (Haliday, 1836)
T. microps (Papp, 1972)
T. minuscula Collin, 1956
T. mitis Roháček & Marshall, 1986
T. novaeguineae (Papp, 1972)
T. nuda Roháček & Marshall, 1986
T. pannosa Roháček & Marshall, 1986
T. pectamera Roháček & Marshall, 1986
T. pedimera Marshall in Marshall & Montagnes, 1990
T. perparva (Williston, 1896)
T. senaria Roháček & Marshall, 1986
T. straminea Roháček & Marshall, 1986
T. vockerothi Marshall in Marshall & Montagnes, 1990

References

Sphaeroceridae
Sphaeroceroidea genera
Diptera of Europe
Diptera of Africa
Diptera of Asia
Diptera of North America
Taxa named by Oswald Duda
Diptera of Australasia